The American National Bank Building (also known as the Commercial and Savings Bank or Morrison's Cafeteria) is a historic bank in West Palm Beach, Florida, United States. On October 8, 1997, it was added to the U.S. National Register of Historic Places.

References

External links

 American National Bank Building at Florida's Office of Cultural and Historical Programs

National Register of Historic Places in Palm Beach County, Florida
Buildings and structures in West Palm Beach, Florida
Bank buildings on the National Register of Historic Places in Florida
Commercial buildings completed in 1921
1921 establishments in Florida